South Kumminin in a small town in the Shire of Narembeen in the Wheatbelt region of Western Australia.

The name is Indigenous Australian in origin but its meaning is unknown.
The town is located along the Kondinin to Merredin railway line. When the railway line opened in 1917 a siding was opened where the townsite is located named Arrowsmith. The name was changed later that year to South Kumminin and lots were surveyed in 1918.
The townsite was gazetted in 1921.

The surrounding areas produce wheat and other cereal crops. The town is a receival site for Cooperative Bulk Handling.

References 

Wheatbelt (Western Australia)
Grain receival points of Western Australia